Events in the year 1872 in Japan.

Incumbents
Emperor: Emperor Meiji
Empress consort: Empress Shōken

Governors
Aichi Prefecture: Iseki Ushitora (starting April 2)
Akita Prefecture: Shima Yoshitake (January 29-July 29), Sugio Magoshichiro (starting July 29)
Aomori Prefecture: J. Hishida
Fukui Prefecture: Kotobuki Murata
Fukushima Prefecture: 
 until January 20: Tomoharu Kiyooka 
 January 20-June 2: Miyahara
 starting June 2: Taihe Yasujo
Gifu Prefecture: Joren Hasegawa
Gunma Prefecture: Sada Aoyama
Hiroshima Prefecture: Date Muneoki
Ibaraki Prefecture: 
 until July 10: Yamaguchi
 August 8-August 13: Motsuke Nomura
 starting August 25: Toru Watanabe
Iwate Prefecture: Korekiyo Shima
Kagawa Prefecture: 
 until October 17: Mohei Hayashi 
 October 17-November 28: Kan'ichi Nakamura 
 starting November 28: Mohei Hayashi 
Kochi Prefecture: Yuzo Hayashi (until November 26), Iwasaki Nagatake (starting November 26)
Kyoto Prefecture: Hase Nobuatsu
Miyagi Prefecture: Ryo Shioya (starting January 8)
Nagano Prefecture: Tachiki Kenzen
Niigata Prefecture: Hirimatsu (starting November 20)
Oita Prefecture: Kei Morishita
Osaka Prefecture: Yotsutsuji Nishi
Saga Prefecture: 
 until July 12: Sadao Koga
 July 12-December 22: Tesshu Yamaoka
 starting December 22: Taku Shigeru
Saitama Prefecture: Morihide Nomura
Shiname Prefecture: 
 until March 30: Masami Terada
 March 30-September 27: Tanenori Ikeda 
 starting September 27: Kamiyama Ren
Tochigi Prefecture: Miki Nabeshima
Tokyo: Yuri Kousei (until September 7), Tadahiro Okubo (starting September 7)
Toyama Prefecture: Miyoshi Zhou Liang
Yamagata Prefecture: ......

Events
date unknown
Tokyo National Museum is founded.
The Imperial Library is established.
Tomioka silk mill, Japan's first modern model silk reeling factory, is established by the government.
The Ryukyu Domain is created when the emperor changes the title of Shō Tai, the Ryukyu Kingdom's monarch (Ryūkyū-koku-ō), to that of a domain head (Ryūkyū-han-ō). The former Ryukyu Kingdom thus becomes a han.

Births
January 22 – Katai Tayama, novelist (d. 1930)
March 25 – Tōson Shimazaki, writer (d. 1943)
May 2 – Ichiyō Higuchi, writer (d. 1896)

Deaths
February 10 - Prince Kitashirakawa Satonari, founder of a collateral branch of the Japanese imperial family (born 1850)
March 28 - Nambu Nobuyuki,  9th and final daimyō of Hachinohe Domain (born 1814)

References

 
1870s in Japan
Years of the 19th century in Japan